Phil Fleming (born 18 September 1957) is  a former Australian rules footballer who played with Footscray in the Victorian Football League (VFL). 		
		
He played in the Footscray Reserves grand final against Richmond at the MCG (Melbourne Cricket Ground) in 1977. 		
		
		1978 and 1979 Phil played at Yallourn/Yallourn North Football Club in the Latrobe Valley league. He was named in team of the century in 2019. Bombers reflect on glory years

Notes

External links 		
		
		
		
		
		
		
Living people		
1957 births		
		
Australian rules footballers from Victoria (Australia)		
Western Bulldogs players
Sale Football Club players